Brian Wilson MLA (born 15 May, 1943) is a Northern Irish politician who was a member of North Down Borough Council for 34 years (1981–2015). He retired when local government was reformed. During this time he served as an Alliance member, Green Party and Independent. He was the first Green Party Councillor to be elected in Northern Ireland in 2005. Wilson served as the Green Party Northern Ireland’s Member of the Northern Ireland Assembly (MLA) for North Down from 2007 to 2011, and was the party’s first elected representative in the Assembly. He agreed to serve as an MLA for a single term, and stood down to be replaced by his research assistant, Steven Agnew.

Early life
Wilson was born in 1943 in Bangor, County Down. He attended Trinity Primary School and Bangor Grammar School. A former civil servant in the Department of Education, he studied part-time at the Open University and in 1973 left the civil service to do a full-time master's degree in Politics at the University of Strathclyde.

Career

Academic career
On his return to Northern Ireland he lectured at Omagh Technical College in 1979 from where he transferred to the College of Business Studies as a lecturer in government and economics. He was a senior lecturer at BIFHE for 24- years, until he retired in 2003.

Political career
In the 1970s he became a member of the Northern Ireland Labour Party and then joined the Alliance Party in 1975. He was elected to North Down Borough Council at the 1981 local elections and was elected mayor in 1993/1994. During this period, he unsuccessfully contested North Down in the 1982 Assembly Election. In 1996 he was an unsuccessful candidate in the Northern Ireland Forum election in North Down.

In 1997 Wilson left the Alliance Party and was elected as an independent councillor for Bangor West in 2001 topping the poll for the fourth successive election with 1871 votes (1.6 quotas).  In 2003 he again stood as an independent candidate for the Assembly increasing his share of the poll by 10% and finishing tenth out of 19 candidates on the first count.

In 2004 he joined the Green Party. The following year he became the first Green Party representative to be elected to public office in Northern Ireland when he again topped the poll in Bangor West.

Then in 2007 he won the first Green Party's seat in the Northern Ireland Assembly, winning a seat in the North Down constituency on the 10th count, after increasing the Green vote from 730 to 2,839 first preferences. He served on the Environment Committee, DRD Committee and Privileges Committee in the Northern Ireland Assembly.

In 2011 he stood down from the Northern Ireland Assembly, in favour of his research assistant Steven Agnew who retained the seat for the Greens.

He stood instead for Bangor West seat on North Down Council, as an independent, standing against both his wife (Anne Wilson, Alliance Party) and the Green Party candidate. Both Wilson and his wife were reelected as councillors. He again topped the poll with his highest ever percentage of first preference votes (1458).

Personal life
In 1979 he married Anne whom he met when studying in Scotland. They have two children Scott (born 1980) and Allan (born 1982) and two step children Roy and Caroline.

He was a member of the Board of Governors of Rathmore Primary School from 1981 to 2011. He is presently a member of the BoG of St. Columbanus College, former member of South Eastern Education and Library Board, former member of North Down District Policing Partnership, former member of the Eastern Health Board & Health Council and former governor of the North Down & Ards Institute.

Brian is also a member of Greenpeace, RSPB and Friends of the Earth.

References

External links
Personal site
Councillor details on North Down Council site
Greens make assembly breakthrough, BBC

1943 births
Living people
People from Bangor, County Down
Members of North Down Borough Council
Green Party in Northern Ireland MLAs
Alliance Party of Northern Ireland politicians
Mayors of places in Northern Ireland
Northern Ireland MLAs 2007–2011
People educated at Bangor Grammar School
Alliance Party of Northern Ireland councillors
Green Party in Northern Ireland councillors